Jeffersonville is the name of several places in the United States:

Jeffersonville, Georgia
Jeffersonville, Illinois
Jeffersonville, Indiana
Jeffersonville, Kentucky
Jeffersonville, New York
Jeffersonville, Ohio
Jeffersonville, Vermont